The Dixie Vodka 400 is a NASCAR Cup Series race held at Homestead–Miami Speedway in Homestead, Florida. The inaugural race was held in 1999 and was the final race in the NASCAR Cup Series from 2002 until 2019, as well as the final race of the NASCAR Cup Series' NASCAR Cup Series playoffs from 2004 to 2019. As the season finale, it was also part of the Ford Championship Weekend, which consisted of two other races, the Ford EcoBoost 200 for the NASCAR Gander Outdoors Truck Series and the Ford EcoBoost 300 for the NASCAR Xfinity Series. The race is contested over 267 laps, 400.5 miles (644.542 km). Kyle Larson is the defending winner of the event.

In 2020, the race was moved to March after the Folds of Honor QuikTrip 500 at Atlanta Motor Speedway, meaning it no longer served as a championship race as the fall race at Phoenix Raceway took that slot. In the aftermath of the COVID-19 pandemic, the race was postponed from the original March 15 date to June 14, 2020. In 2021, the race was held in February, and it was moved to October for 2022.

Past winners

Notes
2004, 2006, and 2016: Races extended due to NASCAR overtime.
2005: First race run under the lights, after being installed during the summer. Ford's last win with the Taurus before switching to the Fusion in 2006.
2018: Ford's last win with the Fusion before switching to the Mustang in the Cup Series in 2019.
2020: Race postponed from March 22 due to the COVID-19 pandemic.
2021: Race moved from February 21 to February 28 after the February 28 race at Auto Club Speedway was cancelled and replaced with Daytona Road Course on February 21.

Multiple winners (drivers)

Multiple winners (teams)

Manufacturer wins

Race summaries
1999: Rookie Tony Stewart wins the inaugural event, and sets the record for most wins by a rookie in the modern era with his 3rd win, with Dale Jarrett clinching the 1999 Winston Cup Championship.
2000: Stewart made it 2-for-2 as he won the race, with his teammate Bobby Labonte clinching the 2000 Winston Cup Championship.
2001: Bill Elliott's 41st career win snapped his 226 race winless streak, the longest streak in between race wins, dating back to the 1994 Mountain Dew Southern 500 at Darlington.
2002: In the final race on the old configuration, Kurt Busch drove to his 4th win in a rain-delayed event, and Stewart won his 1st title.
2003: In the first on a newly reconfigured track, Bobby Labonte's win was marked by a flat tire for leader Bill Elliott on the last lap. In the final race with Winston sponsorship, Labonte took what would become the final win in his Hall of Fame Career.
2004: Fourteen cautions plagued the first race in which it was the final Chase event, and Greg Biffle held off Jimmie Johnson and Jeff Gordon in a Green-White-Checkered finish to win his first of three consecutive races, while his teammate Kurt Busch won the title by 8 points over Johnson.
2005: In the first night race at the track, Greg Biffle dueled teammate Mark Martin over the final 7 laps to edge Martin for the win by 0.017 of a second. Roush ended up with a sweep of the Top 4 spots (Kenseth was 3rd and Edwards 4th), and Stewart won his 2nd title. Greg Biffle's win was his 6th win of the season and he and teammate Carl Edwards were tied for second with both of them 35 points behind Stewart, but Biffle got second thanks to his six wins vs. Edwards four.
2006: Greg Biffle scores his third-consecutive win, and completes the hat-trick for Roush. Mark Martin won the Truck event, Kenseth won the Busch race, and then Biffle winning the Cup event. Jimmie Johnson scores his first of five consecutive Cup titles.
2007: Last race with the fourth-generation car. Matt Kenseth leads 214 of the 267 laps to score the final win before the COT went full-time in 2008, while Johnson goes back to back. It was also the last race Cup series race under Nextel sponsorship.
2008: Carl Edwards scored his 9th win of the season but came up 16 points short of Jimmie Johnson for the Cup title as he stressed his last tank of fuel to the finish, and Johnson tying Cale Yarborough's record of three-consecutive NASCAR Cup Series titles.
2009: Denny Hamlin wins from the furthest back anyone has at the track from 38th to his first win at the track, and Jimmie Johnson scores his record-setting 4th consecutive Championship.
2010: Denny Hamlin came in with a slim lead and lost it after an early race spin. Carl Edwards led a whopping 190 laps on his way to winning the final two races of the season, but Jimmie Johnson scored his inconceivable 5th consecutive Championship.
2011: Tony Stewart and Carl Edwards finished first and second in the race and in the NASCAR Cup Series point standings, Stewart winning the latter due to a tiebreaker.
2012: Brad Keselowski wins the 2012 NASCAR Sprint Cup Series Championship, his first Cup title, and giving Dodge a going away gift. Jeff Gordon won the race beating Clint Bowyer who both fought the week before at Phoenix after crashing on fuel mileage, his first win at Homestead-Miami Speedway, leaving only Kentucky Speedway as the only track he failed to win at in his career. This was also Dodge's last race for the foreseeable future, as they stopped in the NASCAR Cup Series after 2012.
2013: Denny Hamlin ended a miserable 2013 by winning for the second time at Homestead, and Jimmie Johnson scoring his sixth-career Cup title.
2014: With the new Chase Grid format where the top four in points have a shot at the title, the race became known as the Championship Round race, and whoever finished the highest would win the Championship. Kevin Harvick, Denny Hamlin, Joey Logano, and Ryan Newman were the ones who would have the shot at the title. At one point, all four drivers were running 1st–4th, but the race was dominated by pole-sitter Jeff Gordon, who led 160 laps. Due to pit strategy and crazy restarts, Harvick found himself battling Newman on a restart with three laps to go. Harvick in the No. 4 pulled off what his car owner Tony Stewart did three years prior, a Stewart-Haas Racing driver winning both the race and the championship, with Harvick becoming the 2014 champion. Newman would finish second, Hamlin seventh, and Logano 16th due to the jack slipping on a late pit stop.
2015: Kevin Harvick, Kyle Busch, Jeff Gordon, and Martin Truex Jr. were the four drivers going for the title. For the second year in a row, and for the third time in the last five years, a driver won both the race and the championship. This time, it was Joe Gibbs Racing's Kyle Busch, who became the 2015 NASCAR Sprint Cup Series Champion despite missing the first 11 races of the season due to an injury to his leg and foot that he suffered in a wreck during the first Xfinity Series race of the season at Daytona International Speedway. He held off defending champion Harvick in a seven-lap shootout. Also, Gordon, who led nine laps early, finished sixth in his final NASCAR Cup Series start before retiring from racing full-time and moving into the Fox NASCAR broadcast booth for the 2016 season. Truex would wind up finishing 12th, with the Penske guys of Keselowski and Logano being the dominators of the race leading 86 and 72 laps respectively.
2016: This race was the last one under the Sprint brand before Monster Energy would take over for 2017. It was also the last race for Carl Edwards, three-time champion Tony Stewart, Brian Scott, and Greg Biffle. Defending champion Kyle Busch, Joey Logano, Carl Edwards, and six-time champion Jimmie Johnson entered as the four who would compete for the title. Kyle Larson dominated the day, leading 132 laps. On a restart within the final laps, Edwards attempted to block an advancing Logano, but hooked himself into Logano's bumper, sending him careening back into traffic and hard into the outside wall, with the car becoming airborne briefly. Logano came up into his teammate Brad Keselowski and Martin Truex Jr., with Truex's car catching fire. After a lengthy red flag for cleanup, another quick caution flew when Ricky Stenhouse Jr. spun coming onto the backstretch. On an overtime finish, Johnson blasted by Larson and held off Logano to hoist his seventh crown, tying him with Dale Earnhardt and Richard Petty for most all-time in NASCAR's premier division.
2017: For the fourth time using the format, the Championship 4 drivers were Keselowski, Harvick, Kyle Busch, and Martin Truex Jr. For the second straight year, Kyle Larson led the most laps (145) and won the first two stages (NASCAR's new stage format) at laps 80 and 160. A final green-flag run saw Truex and Busch running 1-2 riding up against the wall, with Truex winning the race over Busch and scoring his first championship after leading 78 laps in the No. 78 car.
2018: Kevin Harvick, Kyle Busch, and Martin Truex Jr., and Joey Logano were the final four drivers in the championship round. Truex was in position to win in the final race for Furniture Row Motorsports (which was shutting down at the end of the season). However, a late-race caution with less than 20 laps set up a run to the finish that saw Logano win his first series championship. All four Championship 4 drivers swept the top four finishing positions: Logano-1st, Truex Jr.-2nd, Harvick-3rd, and Kyle Busch-4th. Logano led a race-high 80 laps to become the first driver to lead the most laps and win the race since Carl Edwards in 2010.

See also
Baptist Health 200
Contender Boats 250

References

External links

1999 establishments in Florida
Ford Motor Company
 
NASCAR Cup Series races
Recurring sporting events established in 1999
Annual sporting events in the United States